Natural hoof care is the practice of keeping horses so that their hooves are worn down naturally, or trimmed to emulate natural wear, so they do not suffer overgrowth, splitting and other disorders.  Horseshoes are not used, but domesticated horses may still require trimming, exercise and other measures to maintain a natural shape and degree of wear.

Within the natural hoof care philosophy, the term barefoot horses refers to horses which are kept barefoot, as opposed to horses who are fitted with horseshoes or hoof boots. The hooves of barefoot horses are trimmed with special consideration to a barefoot lifestyle. The barefoot horse movement advocates a generalized use of barefoot horses, both in non-competitive and competitive riding, often coupled with a more natural approach to horse care. Horses are kept barefoot in many parts of the world, including South America, Mongolia and other industrialized and non-industrialized cultures.

History
Horses were ridden and used for work by humans for thousands of years before horseshoes were invented. The Ancient Greeks did not shoe their horses, and Xenophon in his classic work on horsemanship wrote, "naturally sound hooves get spoiled in most stalls," and advised measures to strengthen horses' feet:

More recently, Jaime Jackson, who studied wild and domestic horse hooves, promoted the modern variant of natural hoof care in The Natural Horse: Lessons from the Wild (1992).

Benefits of barefooting
Horses have been used without shoes throughout history. Not only does the horse benefit with a healthier hoof in some cases, it can be less expensive to keep a horse barefoot, and many owners have learned to trim their horses' hooves themselves. As the health and movement benefits of barefooting have become more apparent in horses that have completed transition, horses are being competed barefoot in various sports (including dressage, show jumping, flat racing, steeplechase racing, trail riding and endurance riding).

Barefoot trim

There are several styles of barefoot trim in use today, including the Wild Horse or "Natural Trim" (developed by Jaime Jackson) the 4-Point Trim (Dr. Rick Reddin of NANRIC), the Strasser Trim (one of the most controversial as the horse's sole and bars are scooped out to widen the frog), the "Pete Ramey" trim where elements of the wild horse trim are the goal but the process includes removing hoof wall and forcing the horse to walk primarily on the sole. Some types, such as the 4-Point Trim can be used alone, or with shoes. 

Barefoot trims are marketed to the public as something different from the "pasture" or "field" trim which farriers are trained to provide, taking into consideration hoof health and bony column angles, though each branded type of barefoot trim has its individual differences and there is no standardization or agreement between various barefoot advocacy groups. In contrast to farrier trims, barefoot trims are marketed as an approach to high performance hooves without the need for shoes, or simply as a natural approach to hoof care (depending upon the individual trimming method). However, they are something different, designed by nature itself to maintain a healthy, sound hoof without the use of shoes. 

The barefoot trim aims to emulate the way in which hooves are maintained naturally in *healthy* wild horse herds, like feral horse herds such as the American Mustang or the Australian Brumby, as well as wild zebras and other wild equine populations. Wild horses have been observed by Gene Ovnicek as having a hoof that tends to make contact with the ground on four points, and the hoof wall does not contact the ground at all. But the wild horse studies and measurements gathered by Jaime Jackson, a farrier at the time and working in unison with farrier Leslie Emery (author, Horseshoeing Theory & Practice) from 1982 to 1986 dispute Ovnicek's findings (The Natural Horse: Lessons from the Wild, 1992/1988 American Farriers Association annual conference).  The trim guidelines he created for the AANHCP require the hoof wall to be on the ground as the most distal structure - with the sole, frogs and bars also acting as support structures when the horse is on uneven terrain.  This is said to be another difference between the barefoot trim and the pasture trim, where the hoof wall was left long and in contact with the ground. Like wild horse populations, barefoot domestic horses can develop callouses on the soles of the hooves, allowing them to travel over all types of terrain without discomfort.

Important to the success of the barefoot trim is consideration for the domestic horse's environment and use, and the effects these have on hoof balance, shape, and the comfort of the horse. Objectives depend upon which method is followed: 1) many other than the AANHCP suggest shortening the hoof wall and heel to the outer edge of the concave sole for best hoof conformation, and 2) applying a rounded bevel ("mustang roll") to the bottom edge of the wall to allow for a correct breakover (the moment when the foot unloads and tips forward as it begins to lift off the ground) and to prevent chipping and flaring of the wall.

There is some research, but  no scientific double blind studies, which indicates that removing horseshoes and using barefoot trimming techniques can reduce or in some cases eliminate founder (laminitis) in horses and navicular syndrome.

It is generally agreed upon by most natural hoof care practitioners that the management of the animal (diet and boarding conditions) are the most important components for the success of the horse to be barefoot.  If the diet is unnatural, there will be inflammation and the horse cannot be comfortable.

Impact of horseshoes
Removable iron horseshoes known as "hipposandals" may have been invented by the Roman legions. Nailed-on shoes were certainly used in Europe by the Middle Ages.

Horses were shod with nailed-on horseshoes from the Middle Ages to the present, though well-trained farriers also performed barefoot trimming for horses that did not require the additional protection of shoes. It has become standard practice to shoe most horses in active competition or work. However, there is a growing movement to eliminate shoes on working horses. Advocates of barefooting point out many benefits to keeping horses barefoot and present studies showing that improper shoeing can cause or exacerbate certain hoof ailments in the horse.

Damage from improperly fitted and applied horseshoes can be seen in a gradual distortion of hoof shape, along with other ailments. Hoof soles are often sensitive when going barefoot after a long period of having been shod (because they are not thick enough through callusing). It can take weeks, months, a year, or more, depending on the horse's prior condition, before a horse is sound and usable on bare feet. During this transition period, the horse can be fitted with hoof boots which protect the soles of the feet until the horse has time to heal and build up callouses, though these boots, especially when not properly fitted and used, can cause hoof damage as well.

Hoof health
The two things which can directly affect the health of the hoof are diet and exercise. Observers of wild horse populations note that the equine hoof stays in notably better condition when horses are in a herd situation and are free to move around 24 hours a day, as wild horses do, permitting good circulation inside the hoof. It is recommended that horses be allowed to walk at least five miles per day for optimum hoof health. The terrain should be varied, including gravel or hard surfaces and a water feature where the hooves can be wet occasionally.

Diet & nutrition is very important too, as changes in feed can directly affect hoof health, most notably seen in cases of laminitis. Even hay/grass may be high enough in sugar to cause laminitis. A healthy diet for horses currently with or prone to laminitis is based on free access to hay that has been tested for carbohydrate content and found to be less than 10% WSC + starch, appropriate mineral supplementation, and no grain. Feeds and forage with high levels of sugar (carbohydrates) correlate with higher risk of clinical or subclinical laminitis and with other hoof ailments.

Natural hoof supplements can be used as a boost to the immune systems of horses when concerned with laminitis or other hoof ailments. D-Biotin supplements, often including the sulfur-containing amino acid dl-Methionine, are commonly known supplements that may be helpful for managing hoof health if they're deficient/imbalanced in the diet.

Modern research by individuals such as Jaime Jackson and Tia Nelson have studied feral horses to observe the way in which their natural foraging and roaming affects their hooves. They noticed that the hooves of these horses have a different configuration from domestic horses kept in soft pasture, having shorter toes and thicker, stronger hoof walls.

Controversies
 
Whether wearing shoes or going barefoot is better for the horse is the subject of some controversy. Opponents of the barefoot movement argue that domesticated horses are routinely put through abnormal levels of activity, stress, and strain, and their hooves undergo excessive wear and shock. Stable-kept horses are not exposed to the same environment as wild horses, which can affect their hoof quality. Additionally, humans sometimes favor certain traits over hoof quality (such as speed), and will breed horses with poor hoof quality if they are exceptional athletes. This can lead to overall decreased hoof quality within a breed and in riding horses in general. Advocates of traditional hoof care suggest that shoeing is needed to protect the hoof from unnatural destruction, and that the horseshoe and its various incarnations has been necessary to maintain the horse's usability under extreme and unnatural conditions.

See also
 Equine forelimb anatomy
 Equine podiatry
 Farrier
 Horse care
 Horseshoe
 Hiltrud Strasser
 Jaime Jackson
 Horse hoof
 Lameness (equine)

References

 The Natural Trim: Principles and Practice, J. Jackson, J Jackson Publishing, 2012

Equine hoof
Horse management